Milakpur is a village situated in the Bhiwani district of Haryana, India. Milakpur comes under Hisar (Lok Sabha constituency), which is represented in Lok Sabha by Dushyant Chautala of INLD. The village serves under the jurisdiction of Bhiwani Administration under police station at Bawani Khera, which also serves as Tehsil to the village.

Location
The Bus stand of the village caters to the needs of more than six villages and the village railway station, Aurangnagar, also provides for surrounding villages.

Economy
The area is known for its large number of brick kilns, which cater to the demand of bricks from surrounding areas and other areas as far flung as Bhiwani and Hisar. However, the residents are not concerned about the pollution and ecological devastation caused by them, perhaps due to lack of environmental awareness. Indeed, not even the authorities are concerned by their detrimental effect on the ecology and the environment of the area.

Like most of the villages in Haryana, Milakpur too has made a big contribution towards the Indian Army as soldiers and officers. Though the former outnumber the latter when quantified. Lack of other economic avenues and poor quality education lead to this choice rather than strong feelings of nationalism and patriotism. In addition to a career in the army, other occupations range from brick kiln management, farming, labour, teaching, to Mom and pop shop management. Of these, farming remains the largest and the default source of livelihood.

Education
Hansi,a town just six kilometers away, exerts significant urban influence upon the village. Increased educational awareness among the people has resulted in a more proactive stance towards education for their wards. In their quest for quality education, the number of pupils attending English medium schools in surrounding urban areas has increased significantly, despite the expensive fees in comparison to the overlooking free state-run schools where only children of under-privileged families find way. Indeed, the quality of state-run schools is so severely worse than urban schools that children from a poorer socio-economic background, who cannot afford urban schools, are compelled to go to private village schools. The quality of education of these schools is questionable and they have nothing in the name of infrastructure. Sanitation facilities are rare. This clearly indicates the shoddy state of education in the area and brings into light the bogus claims of improving quality of education made by the polity. The poor quality of education, in conjunction with other factors, contributes to the sheer prevalence of inequality among people, at large.

External links

See also
 List of Indus Valley Civilization sites

References

Indus Valley civilisation sites
Pre-Indus Valley civilisation sites
Archaeological sites in Haryana
Villages in Bhiwani district
Bhiwani district